Snedker is a surname. Notable people with the surname include:

Dean Snedker (born 1994), English footballer
James Snedker (1911–1981), Canadian politician in Saskatchewan